The Tower of San Ciprianu ( or , , ;) is a Genoese tower located in the French commune of Lecci, Southern Corsica. The tower sits at an elevation of 57 m and guarded the entrance to the port of Porto-Vecchio.

The construction of the tower was begun in 1589. It is one of a series of coastal defences constructed by the Republic of Genoa between 1530 and 1620 to stem the attacks by Barbary pirates. The design of the San Ciprianu tower is unusual in being square rather than round. The tower is privately owned and in 1995 was listed as one of the official historical monuments of France.

Notes and references

External links
 Includes information on how to reach 90 towers and many photographs.

Towers in Corsica
Monuments historiques of Corsica